Chionanthus quadristamineus, commonly known as the blue plum, is a flowering plant in the olive family. The specific epithet refers to the four stamens in the flowers.

Description
Chionanthus quadristamineus is a pale-barked, evergreen tree, growing to 15 m in height. The leathery, broadly elliptic to narrowly obovate leaves are 5–12 cm long and 3–6 cm wide. The small green flowers are 5 mm in diameter. The egg-shaped fruits are 5–6 cm long and dark blue when ripe. The flowering season is from November to May.

Distribution and habitat
Chionanthus quadristamineus is endemic to Australia’s subtropical Lord Howe Island in the Tasman Sea. It is common in forest from sea-level to elevations of about 400 m in the southern mountains of the island.

References

quadristamineus
Endemic flora of Lord Howe Island
Lamiales of Australia
Plants described in 1873
Taxa named by Ferdinand von Mueller